Parmotrema aptrootii is a species of corticolous lichen in the family Parmeliaceae. Found in South America, it was described as new to science in 1992. The holotype specimen was collected in the Cuyuni-Mazaruni region of Guyana, where it was found growing on a Mahogany tree on the bank of the Kamarang River. The specific epithet honours Dutch lichenologist André Aptroot. The lichen has also been recorded from  Acre, Brazil, where it is commonly found on dead branches in dense shrubby campinas.

See also
List of Parmotrema species

References

aptrootii
Lichen species
Lichens described in 1992
Lichens of North Brazil
Lichens of Guyana